Jazz Erotica is a 1957 jazz album by American tenor saxophone player Richie Kamuca and baritone saxophone player Bill Holman. It was rereleased in 1959, without the "quite revealing painting of a nude woman on the cover", under the "more conventional title" West Coast Jazz in Hifi.

AllMusic critic Ken Dryden commented that one should expect to pay "a premium price" for it. Tim Neely's Goldmine Jazz Album Price Guide (2011) suggests $200 for a near-mint copy.

Track listing

Personnel

Richie Kamuca – tenor saxophone
Bill Holman – baritone saxophone
Frank Rosolino – trombone
Conte Candoli – trumpet
Ed Leddy – trumpet
Vince Guaraldi – piano
Monty Budwig – bass
Stan Levey – drums

References

External links
JAZZ EROTICA at lpcover.wordpress.com

1957 albums
Jazz albums by American artists